The Zimbabwe cricket team toured Bangladesh in February and March 2020 to play one Test match, three One Day International (ODI) and two Twenty20 International (T20I) matches. On 26 January 2020, the Bangladesh Cricket Board (BCB) confirmed the itinerary for the tour. It was the first time that a tour between the two sides featured a one-off Test match. Zimbabwe last toured Bangladesh in October and November 2018, and last won a series in the country during their tour in November 2001. On 9 February, the BCB moved the three ODI matches from Chittagong to the Sylhet International Cricket Stadium, to give the venue more exposure and international attention. The one-off Test match was the 100th international match to be played between the two sides.

Zimbabwe Cricket announced the squad for the one-off Test, with Craig Ervine named as the team's captain. Sean Williams, Zimbabwe's regular Test captain, took leave ahead of the match for the birth of his first child. Bangladesh won the one-off Test match by an innings and 106 runs.

Ahead of the tour, the BCB announced that it would be Mashrafe Mortaza's last series as captain of the ODI team. Prior to the third ODI, Mortaza confirmed that he would be stepping down as Bangladesh's ODI captain after the series. Bangladesh won the ODI series 3–0, with Mashrafe Mortaza recording his 50th win in an ODI match as captain with victory in the third match. Tamim Iqbal was appointed as the new ODI captain ahead of Bangladesh's next fixture, the one-off match against Pakistan.

In an attempt to mitigate the impact of the COVID-19 pandemic, the BCB restricted ticket sales for the first T20I match to one per person. Bangladesh won the T20I series 2–0, to win all six international fixtures against Zimbabwe in the series. It was the first time that Bangladesh had whitewashed a team in a single series across all three formats of international cricket.

Squads

Soumya Sarkar was added to Bangladesh's squad for the third ODI.

Tour match

Two-day match: Bangladesh Cricket Board XI vs Zimbabwe

Only Test

ODI series

1st ODI

2nd ODI

3rd ODI

T20I series

1st T20I

2nd T20I

Notes

References

External links
 Series home at ESPN Cricinfo

2020 in Bangladeshi cricket
2020 in Zimbabwean cricket
International cricket competitions in 2019–20
Zimbabwean cricket tours of Bangladesh